The Metropolitan Cathedral of Our Lady of the Conception, also called Catedral Metropolitana de Manaus, is a Catholic cathedral located in the city of Manaus, state of Amazonas, northern Brazil.

Is the mother church of the city, dating back to the Carmelite missionaries who, in 1695, created the early Church of Our Lady.

This space was rebuilt by the President of the Province Manoel da Gama Lobo D'Almada, who did expand its facilities. The new work, however, was destroyed by a devastating fire in 1850.

The current building is Greek style, with much of the material imported from Europe, especially Portugal; the six bells were made in a Portuguese foundry, and the chapel, baptistery and three altars all are made of limestone from Lisbon. The tiles came from Nova Rainha (now Parintins).

In 1892 the Diocese of Amazonas was created; the church was officially opened in 1878.

In 1946 the church was elevated to cathedral status.

See also
Roman Catholicism in Brazil
Metropolitan cathedral (disambiguation)

References

Roman Catholic cathedrals in Brazil
Buildings and structures in Manaus
Roman Catholic churches completed in 1878
Roman Catholic churches in Amazonas (Brazilian state)
19th-century Roman Catholic church buildings in Brazil
Neoclassical church buildings in Brazil